Since 1988, the Executive Council of Manitoba has included a minister responsible for Seniors.  The position is not a full cabinet portfolio.

The current Minister responsible for Seniors is Kerri Irvin-Ross.

List of ministers responsible for Seniors

Source:  Legislative Assembly of Manitoba

Seniors, Minister responsible for